Orazio Mariani (January 21, 1915 – October 16, 1981) was an Italian athlete who competed mainly in the 100 metre sprint.

Biography
He competed for Italy in the 1936 Summer Olympics held in Berlin, Germany in the 4 x 100 metre relay where he won the silver medal with his team mates Gianni Caldana, Elio Ragni and Tullio Gonnelli. In 1938 in the European Championships Mariani won the silver medal in the 200 metres.

Olympic results

Competition record

National titles
Orazio Mariani has won 8 times the individual national championship.
7 wins in the 100 metres (1933, 1936, 1937, 1938, 1939, 1942, 1943)
1 win in the 200 metres (1943)

References

External links
 

1915 births
1981 deaths
Athletes from Milan
Italian male sprinters
Athletes (track and field) at the 1936 Summer Olympics
Olympic athletes of Italy
Olympic silver medalists for Italy
European Athletics Championships medalists
Medalists at the 1936 Summer Olympics
Olympic silver medalists in athletics (track and field)
Italian Athletics Championships winners